These are the awards and nominations received by the American indie rock band, Fun. Fun won four awards from 27 nominations. They were nominated for six Grammys, including Record of the Year ("We Are Young") and Album of the Year (Some Nights), and won Best New Artist and Song of the Year.

American Music Awards
Created by Dick Clark in 1973, the American Music Awards is an annual music awards ceremony and one of several major annual American music awards shows.

|-
|rowspan="2"|2012
|rowspan="2"|Fun.
|New Artist of the Year
|
|-
|Favorite Pop/Rock Band/Duo/Group
|
|-

Billboard Music Awards
The Billboard Music Awards are an annual awards show from Billboard Magazine.

|-
|rowspan="13"|2013
|rowspan="5"|Fun.
|Hot 100 Artist
|
|-
|Top Radio Songs Artist
|
|-
|Top Digital Songs Artist
|
|-
|Top Duo/Group 
|
|-
|Top Rock Artist
|
|-
|rowspan="4"|"We Are Young"
|Top Streaming Song (Audio)
|
|-
|Top Streaming Song (Video)
|
|-
|Top Digital Song
|
|-
|Top Rock Song
|
|-
|rowspan="3"|"Some Nights"
|Top Streaming Song (Audio)
|
|-
|Top 100 Song
|
|-
|Top Rock Song
|
|-
|rowspan="1"|Some Nights
|Top Rock Album
|
|-

BRIT Awards
The Brit Awards are the British Phonographic Industry's annual pop music awards.

|-
|rowspan="1"|2013
|rowspan="1"|Fun
|Best International Group
|
|-

Grammy Awards
The Grammy Awards are awarded annually by the National Academy of Recording Arts and Sciences of the United States. Fun. earned two Grammys out of six nominations.

|-
|rowspan="6"|2013
|rowspan="1"|Fun.
|Best New Artist
|
|-
|rowspan="3"|"We Are Young"
|Record of the Year
|
|-
|Song of the Year
|
|-
|Best Pop Duo/Group Performance
|
|-
|rowspan="2"|Some Nights
|Album of the Year
|
|-
|Best Pop Vocal Album
|
|-

International Dance Music Awards
The International Dance Music Awards are an annual awards show honoring dance and electronic artist.

|-
|2013
|"Some Nights"
|Best Alternative/Indie Rock Dance Track
|
|-

MTV Video Music Awards
The MTV Video Music Awards were established in 1984 by MTV to celebrate the top music videos of the year.

|-
|rowspan="2"|2012
|rowspan="2"|"We Are Young"
|Best New Artist
|
|-
|Best Pop Video
|
|-
|rowspan="2"|2013
|rowspan="2"|"Carry On"
|Best Pop Video
|
|-
|Best Direction
|
|-

MTV Europe Music Awards
The MTV Europe Music Awards (EMA) were established in 1994 by MTV Networks Europe to celebrate the most popular music videos in Europe.

|-
|rowspan="3"|2012
|rowspan="2"|Fun
|Best New Act
|
|-
|Best Push Act
|
|-
|"We Are Young"
|Best Song
|
|-

MTV Video Music Awards Japan
The MTV Video Music Awards Japan is the Japanese version of the MTV Video Music Awards.

|-
|rowspan="3"|2013
|rowspan="3"|"We Are Young"
|Best Group Video
|
|-
|Best New Artist
|
|-
|Best Rock Video
|
|-

MVPA Awards
The Music Video Production Association (MVPA) is a non-profit trade organization created to address the mutual concerns of its members in today's highly competitive, ever-changing music video industry.

|-
| 2012
| "We Are Young"
| Director of the Year 
| 
|-
| 2013
| "Why Am I the One"
| Best Alternative Video
|

MuchMusic Video Awards
The MuchMusic Video Awards is an annual awards ceremony honoring the best music videos of Canadian artists. 

|-
|2013
|"Some Nights"
|International Video of the Year – Group
|
|-

Premios 40 Principales
The Premios 40 Principales is an annual Spanish awards show that recognises the people and works of pop musicians.

|-
| 2012
| Fun
| Best International New Act
|
|-
|}

mtvU Woodie Awards

|-
|2012
|"We Are Young"
|Breaking Woodie
|
|-

NewNowNext Awards

|-
|2012
|Fun
|Brink of Fame Music Artist
|
|-

Peoples Choice Awards
The People's Choice Awards is an awards show recognizing the people and the work of popular culture. 

|-
|rowspan="3"|2013
|"We Are Young"
|Favorite Song of the Year
|
|-
|Some Nights
|Favorite Album of the Year
|
|-
|Fun
|Favorite Breakout Artist
|
|-

Q Awards
Q Awards were established in 1985 and the UK's annual music awards run by the music magazine Q.

|-
||2012
|"We Are Young"
|Best Track
|
|-

Teen Choice Awards
The Teen Choice Awards were established in 1999 to honor the year's biggest achievements in music, movies, sports and television, being voted by young people aged between 13 and 19.

|-
|rowspan="4"|2012
|rowspan="2"|Fun
|Choice Rock Group
|
|-
|Choice Breakout Group
|
|-
|rowspan="2"|"We Are Young"
|Choice Rock Song
|
|-
|Choice Single by a Group
|
|-
|rowspan="2"|2013
|Fun
|Choice Music Group
|
|-
|"Carry On"
|Choice Music: Rock Song
|

References

External links
 Official website
 Fun at AllMusic
 
 

Awards
Lists of awards received by American musician
Lists of awards received by musical group